"Somebody to Die For" is the third single by English musical duo Hurts from their second studio album "Exile", released on 21 July 2013. The song is co-produced with Dan Grech-Marguerat (Lana Del Rey, Moby). Jonas Quant produced the track for the single release.

Live performances
The duo premiered the track during a special live session at Spotify in January 2013 and on 17 May 2013 in an acoustic session for The Sun Biz Sessions.

Music video
The music video was directed by Frank Borin, who also directed the duo's second version of "Miracle" video in 2013. Visual effects were created by GloriaFX at Digital Ukraine. It was filmed at the Salvation Mountain in the desert near Slab City just several miles from the Salton Sea in California. Video with around Christian imagery continues the religious theme of their video for "Blind".

Formats and track listing
Digital EP
"Somebody to Die For" (Radio Edit) — 3:20
"Somebody to Die For" (Unplugged) — 3:27
"Somebody to Die For" (Franz Novotny Remix) — 6:33
"Exile" (Freemasons Club Mix) — 7:11

German EP
"Somebody to Die For" (Radio Edit) — 3:20
"Ohne Dich" — 4:31
"Somebody to Die For" (Unplugged) — 3:27
"Somebody to Die For" (Franz Novotny Remix) — 6:33
"Exile" (Freemasons Club Mix) — 7:11
"Somebody to Die For" (Music Video) — 3:50

Charts

Release history

Personnel
 Hurts — keyboards, lyrics, music, programming, production
 Jonas Quant — co-producer, single version
 Dan Grech-Marguerat — engineer, producer
 Jakob Hermann — engineering
 Duncan Fuller — assistant engineering
 Pete Watson — piano
 Paul Walsham — drums
 Wil Malone — conductor, performance arranger
 Boguslaw Kostecki, Cathy Thompson, Chris Tombling, Dermot Crehan, Emil Chakalov, Emlyn Singleton, Gaby Lester, Jonathan Rees, Julian Leaper, Liz Edwards, Maciej Rakowski, Mark Berrow, Patrick Kiernan, Perry Montague-Mason, Peter Hanson, Rita Manning, Tom Pigott-Smith, Warren Zielinski — violin
 Andy Parker, Bruce White, Garfield Jackson, Rachel Stephanie Bolt, Steve Wright, Vicci Wardman — viola
 Allen Walley, Mary Scully, Steve Mair — bass

References

External links 
 

2013 singles
2013 songs
Hurts songs
Sony Music singles
RCA Records singles